Helen Gillian Oxenbury (born 1938) is an English illustrator and writer of children's picture books. She lives in North London. She has twice won the annual Kate Greenaway Medal, the British librarians' award for illustration and been runner-up four times. For the 50th anniversary of that Medal (1955–2005) her 1999 illustrated edition of Alice's Adventures in Wonderland was named one of the top ten winning works.

Background
Helen Oxenbury was raised in Ipswich, Suffolk. Her father was an architect. From an early age she developed a passion for drawing. After leaving school, she attended the Ipswich School of Art as a teenager, and during holidays she worked at a small theatre in Felixstowe and at the Ipswich Repertory Theatre Workshop, mixing paints. She went on to study in London at the Central School of Art and Design (1957-1959), where she met her future husband, John Burningham.

In her adult life she embarked on a career in theatre, film and television. She worked as assistant designer at Colchester Repertory Theatre, and for three years as painter and designer for the Habima Theatre in Tel Aviv, Israel. In 1962 she returned to Britain and did some design work for ABC Television and Shepperton Film Studios.

After marrying the children's book author and illustrator John Burningham in 1964, she turned to illustrating children’s books herself. In 1980, she created a series of books about a mischievous young boy called Tom, and his stuffed monkey, Pippo. She commented that Tom was very much like her own son in his younger years. Like Tom, her son would often blame his misdeeds on an accomplice (the family dog). She continues to illustrate books. In 1994, Tom and Pippo was adapted into a French animated series which ran for 104 two-minute episodes. Some of her most recent work includes the illustrations for The Growing Story in the September 2008 edition of Bayard Presse's StoryBox magazine.

Awards
Oxenbury is one of 14 illustrators to win two Kate Greenaway Medals (established 1955); Burningham is another. At the time, the annual award by the British Library Association (now CILIP) recognised the year's best children's book illustration by a British subject; two books were occasionally cited; there was no cash prize. Oxenbury won the Medal in 1969; the two books cited were The Quangle Wangle's Hat, an edition of Edward Lear's 19th-century poem, and The Dragon of an Ordinary Family, a new story by Margaret Mahy, both published by Heinemann.

From 1989 to 1994 she was the Highly Commended runner up four times and she won again for an edition of Alice in Wonderland (Walker, 1999). CILIP's retrospective citation says: "More abundantly illustrated than previous editions ... Alice herself is a child of today – casually dressed, personable and spirited." Alice was named one of the top ten Greenaway Medal-winning works by a 2007 panel, composing the ballot for a public election of the all-time favourite.

Oxenbury won two "Emils", the Kurt Maschler Award by the Maschler publishers and Booktrust that annually (1982 to 1999) recognised one "work of imagination for children, in which text and illustration are integrated so that each enhances and balances the other." The first was for So Much by Trish Cooke, one of her Greenaway runners up, and the second for Alice.

Oxenbury also won three Nestlé Smarties Book Prizes (1985 to 2007), all in the 0–5 years category. The Smarties Prize winners were elected by children from shortlists composed by a panel. Oxenbury-illustrated picture books were the overall winners for 1989, We're Going on a Bear Hunt retold by Michael Rosen, and for 1991, Farmer Duck by Martin Waddell, another Greenaway runner up. So Much was the 1994 age group winner.

Farmer Duck was also the 1991 Illustrated Children's Book of the Year (British Book Awards). Tickle, Tickle, written and illustrated by Oxenbury, won the 1999 Booktrust Early Years Award. In the United States, Big Momma Makes the World by Phillis Root won the Boston Globe–Horn Book Award, picture books category.

Media
Oxenbury was the guest on the long-running Desert Island Discs on the BBC Radio 4 programme on Sunday 29 November 2020. hosted by Lauren Laverne.

Selected works 
These are all children's books.

WorldCat reports that Oxenbury's works most widely held in participating libraries are three of her Greenaway Medal runners up, all written by other authors: We're Going on a Bear Hunt (1989), Three Little Wolves and the Big Bad Pig (1993), and Farmer Duck (1991).

  The Quangle Wangle's Hat (Heinemann, 1969), by Edward Lear (late 19th century) 
 —joint winner of the Kate Greenaway Medal
  The Dragon of an Ordinary Family (Heinemann, 1969), by Margaret Mahy
 —joint winner of the Greenaway Medal
  Letters of Thanks (Collins, 1969), by Manghanita Kempadoo
  Pig Tale (1973), written in rhyme and illustrated 
  Cakes and Custard (Heinemann, 1975, children's rhymes selected by Brian Alderson (children's book critic) 
  I can (1985), a board book for babies
  I hear (1985), a board book for babies
  I see (1985), a board book for babies
  The Helen Oxenbury Nursery Story Book (1985), familiar folk tales
  All Fall Down (1987), written and illustrated
  Clap Hands (1987), written and illustrated
  Say Goodnight (1987), written and illustrated
  We're Going on a Bear Hunt (Walker, 1989), retold by Michael Rosen
 —winner of the Nestlé Smarties Book Prize (age 0–5 and overall) 
 —Greenaway runner up, Highly Commended
  Farmer Duck (Walker), 1991, by Martin Waddell
 —winner of the British Illustrated Children's Book of the Year and the Smarties Prize (age 0–5 and overall) 
 —Greenaway runner up, Highly Commended
  The Three Little Wolves and the Big Bad Pig (1993), illustrated by Helen Oxenbury, written by Eugene Trivizas 
 —Greenaway runner up, Highly Commended
 —Parents' Choice Gold Award
  It's My Birthday (1993), written and illustrated
  So Much (Walker), 1994, by Trish Cooke
 —winner of the Kurt Maschler Award and the Smarties Prize (ages 0–5 years)
 —Greenaway runner up, Highly Commended
  Tickle, Tickle (1999), written and illustrated
 —Booktrust Early Years Award 
  Alice's Adventures in Wonderland (Walker Books, 1999), an edition of the 1865 classic by Lewis Carroll
 —winner of the Kurt Maschler Award and the Kate Greenaway Medal
  Franny B. Kranny, There's a Bird in Your Hair (2000), by Harriet Goldhor Lerner
  Big Momma Makes the World (2002), by Phyllis Root
 —winner of the 2003 Boston Globe–Horn Book Award, Picture Book
  Alice Through the Looking Glass (Walker, 2005), an edition of Through the Looking Glass by Lewis Carroll (1871)
  The Growing Story (2007), by Ruth Krauss (1947)
  Ten Little Fingers and Ten Little Toes (2008), by Mem Fox
  There's Going to Be a Baby (2010), by John Burningham
  The Giant Jumperee (Re-Illustrator in 2017), by Julia Donaldson
  Red Riding Hood (2019), Lost Story by Beatrix Potter
  Welcome to the World (2022), by Julia Donaldson

Notes

References

Further reading
 D. Martin, "Helen Oxenbury", in Douglas Martin, The Telling Line Essays On Fifteen Contemporary Book Illustrators (1989), pp. 202–14

 

1938 births
Living people
20th-century English women artists
21st-century English women artists
Alumni of the Central School of Art and Design
Artists from Ipswich
British children's book illustrators
British illustrators
Kate Greenaway Medal winners
Date of birth missing (living people)
Place of birth missing (living people)